The yellow chromis (Chromis analis), also known as the yellow puller, is a species of marine fish in the family Pomacentridae.  It is widespread throughout the tropical waters of the central Indo-Pacific region. A small fish, it can reach a maximum size of 17 cm in  length.

References

External links
 Fishes of Australia : Chromis analis
 

yellow chromis
Marine fish of Northern Australia
yellow chromis
Taxa named by Georges Cuvier